Intraflagellar transport 27 is a protein that in humans is encoded by the IFT27 gene.

Function

This gene encodes a GTP-binding protein that is a core component of the intraflagellar transport complex B. Characterization of the similar Chlamydomonas protein indicates a function in cell cycle control. Alternative splicing of this gene results in multiple transcript variants. [provided by RefSeq, Jan 2012].

References

Further reading